"All Quiet on the Western Front" is a song by English musician Elton John with lyrics by Bernie Taupin. It is the closing track of his 1982 album, Jump Up!. It was also released as a single in the UK without charting.

It is an anti-war song about World War I, and named after the book of the same name. The song also ends in a big orchestral finale including a church organ chord sequence played by James Newton Howard on a synthesizer, which can be said to be reminiscent of his earlier album closers such as "The King Must Die" and "Burn Down the Mission", and a chorus sung by the Choir of St Paul's Cathedral, London.

The song's only live performances came during John's world tour during 1982, outside North America. At a concert on Christmas Eve of the same year at the Hammersmith Apollo, London, John jokingly announced that, at the time, it was "the worst-selling single in Phonogram's history".

The version issued on single is shorter; it also appeared on the 1982 compilation album Love Songs. The B-side contains a rockier version of album track "Where Have All the Good Times Gone"; it appeared decades later on the Elton: Jewel Box compilation album.

See also
List of anti-war songs

References

Elton John songs
1982 singles
1982 songs
Anti-war songs
Songs with lyrics by Bernie Taupin
Songs with music by Elton John
Song recordings produced by Chris Thomas (record producer)
All Quiet on the Western Front
Geffen Records singles
The Rocket Record Company singles
Songs about World War I